Bulldogs are a type of dog that were traditionally used for the blood sports of baiting and dog fighting, but today are kept for other purposes, including companion dogs, guard dogs and catch dogs. Bulldogs are typically stocky, powerful, square-built animals with large, strong, brachycephalic-type muzzles. "Bull" is a reference that originated in England that refers to the sport of bull baiting, which was a national sport in England between the 13th and 18th century. It is believed bulldogs were developed during the 16th century in the Elizabethan era from the larger mastiffs, as smaller, more compact dogs were better suited for baiting.

List of bulldog breeds

Extant breeds
 Alano Español (Spanish Bulldog)
 Alapaha Blue Blood Bulldog
 American Bulldog
 Bulldog
 Campeiro Bulldog
 Continental Bulldog
 French Bulldog
 Olde English Bulldogge
 Perro de Presa Mallorquin
 Serrano Bulldog

Extinct breeds
 Bullenbeisser (German Bulldog)
 Old English Bulldog
 Toy Bulldog

Gallery

References

Further reading

 
 

 
Dog types

cs:Buldok
fr:Bulldog (homonymie)
he:בולדוג
hu:Buldog (egyértelműsítő lap)
tr:Buldok (anlam ayrımı)